Benjamin Terry (born Oct. 6, 1994) is a Ghanaian footballer who plays as a winger or second striker for Al-Bahri in the Iraqi Premier League.

Honours
FC Stumbras
Lithuanian Football Cup: 2017.

References

External links
 
 

1994 births
Living people
Ghanaian footballers
Ghanaian expatriate footballers
Association football wingers
Ghana Premier League players
Tema Youth players
Ashanti Gold SC players
FC Stumbras players
Expatriate footballers in Lithuania
Expatriate footballers in Iraq
Ghanaian expatriates in Lithuania
Ghanaian expatriates in Iraq